Coronidia orithea is a moth of the family Sematuridae. It is known from the Neotropics, including Suriname, French Guiana, and Peru.

The larvae feed on Phoradendron quadrangulare.

References 

Sematuridae
Moths described in 1780